William Chaytor (11 January 1732 – 15 May 1819) was a British lawyer and politician who sat in the House of Commons  from 1774 to 1790.

Born in Croft, Yorkshire, Chaytor was the son of Henry Chaytor and his wife Jane (née Smales). His grand-uncle was Sir William Chaytor, 1st and last Baronet (of the 1671 creation). He entered Magdalene College, Cambridge in 1750 and was admitted to Lincoln's Inn in 1753. He served as a Recorder of Richmond and sat as Member of Parliament for Penryn from 1774 to 1780 and Hedon from 1780 to 1790.

Chaytor married Jane Lee. Their son William, who was born before his parents' marriage, was created a Baronet in 1831 (see Chaytor baronets). Chaytor died in May 1819, aged 87.

Notes

References 

1732 births
1819 deaths
Alumni of Magdalene College, Cambridge
Members of Lincoln's Inn
British MPs 1774–1780
British MPs 1780–1784
British MPs 1784–1790
Members of the Parliament of Great Britain for constituencies in Cornwall